Dark Holiday is a 1989 American TV movie starring Lee Remick. It was Remick's last performance.

Plot
An American tourist winds up in a Turkish prison.

References

External links

1989 television films
1989 films
American prison films
American television films
Films set in prison
Films set in Turkey
Films directed by Lou Antonio
1980s American films